The Hay–Bunau-Varilla Treaty was a treaty signed on November 18, 1903, by the United States and Panama, which established the Panama Canal Zone and the subsequent construction of the Panama Canal. It was named after its two primary negotiators, Philippe-Jean Bunau-Varilla, the French diplomatic representative of Panama, and United States Secretary of State John Hay.

Background

Bunau-Varilla was originally involved in the building of the Panama Canal under Ferdinand de Lesseps, who had built the Suez Canal. After the collapse of the de Lesseps efforts to build the Panama Canal, Bunau-Varilla became an important shareholder of the Compagnie Nouvelle du Canal de Panama, which still had the concession, as well as certain valuable assets, for the building of a canal in Panama. Although not Panamanian himself, Bunau-Varilla had provided financial assistance to the rebel side in Panama's independence from Colombia, which occurred two weeks prior to the signing of the treaty. He had not, however, been in Panama for seventeen years, nor had he ever returned. As part of the Hay–Bunau-Varilla negotiations, the U.S. bought the shares and assets of the Compagnie Nouvelle du Canal de Panama for US$40 million.

Terms
The treaty was negotiated in Washington, D.C. and New York City. The terms of the treaty stated that the United States was to receive rights to a canal zone which was to extend five miles on either side of the canal route in perpetuity, and Panama was to receive a payment from the U.S. up to $10 million and an annual rental payment of $250,000. Though legally, Panama never officially became a colony of the United States. Instead of full overbearing control, the Hay–Bunau-Varilla Treaty gave the United States governance only in the Canal Zone.

Aftermath
This treaty was a source of conflict between Panama and the United States since its creation. The Canal Zone became a racially and socially segregated area, set aside from the country of Panama. The push for environmental determinism seemed to be the best framework to justify American practices in Panama. The conflict from the treaty reached its peak on January 9, 1964, with riots over sovereignty of the Panama Canal Zone. The riot started after a Panamanian flag was torn during conflict between Panamanian students and Canal Zone Police officers, over the right of the Panamanian flag to be flown alongside the U.S. flag. U.S. Army units became involved in suppressing the violence after the Canal Zone Police were overwhelmed. After three days of fighting, about 22 Panamanians and four U.S. soldiers were killed. This day is known in Panama as Martyrs' Day.

The events of January 9 were considered to be a significant factor in the U.S. decision to negotiate the 1977 Torrijos–Carter Treaties, which finally abolished the Hay–Bunau-Varilla Treaty and allowed the gradual transfer of control of the Canal Zone to Panama and the handover of the full control of the Panama Canal on December 31, 1999.

See also
Clayton–Bulwer Treaty
Hay–Pauncefote Treaty
Hay–Herrán Treaty

Further reading

Bunau-Varilla, Philippe. Panama: The Creation, Destruction, and Resurrection. New York: McBride, Nast and Company, 1914. Google Books.

References

External links

Full text of the Convention Between the United States and the Republic of Panama

Panama Canal Zone
Treaties of the United States
History of Panama
History of the Panama Canal Zone
Banana Wars
Treaties of Panama
Treaties concluded in 1903
Presidency of Theodore Roosevelt
Panama–United States relations
1903 in Washington, D.C.
November 1903 events
United States involvement in regime change